Katedra (cathedral in Polish, in Lithuanian) can refer to:
 The Cathedral (2002 film), a short animated movie by Tomasz Bagiński
 Chair (academic department), a type of a university department in Poland
Katedra (band), a Lithuanian heavy metal band